The Rakaia River is in the Canterbury Plains in New Zealand's South Island. The Rakaia River is one of the largest braided rivers in New Zealand. In the 1850s, European settlers named it the Cholmondeley River, but this name lapsed into disuse.

Description
It forms a hapua as it reaches the ocean.

For much of its journey, the river is braided, running through a wide shingle bed. Close to Mount Hutt, however, it is briefly confined to a narrow canyon known as the Rakaia Gorge.

The Rakaia River is bridged in two places. The busiest crossing is at the small town of Rakaia,  from the river mouth, where State Highway 1 using Rakaia Bridge and the South Island Main Trunk Railway cross the river using separate bridges. A second bridge, much shorter and less used, spans the Rakaia Gorge.

The Rakaia River is a celebrated Chinook salmon fishery. It has been identified as an Important Bird Area by BirdLife International because it supports breeding colonies of the endangered black-billed gull. The river is also known for its large wrybill population which represents 73 percent of the total population.  Other important bird species using the riverbed are black-fronted tern and banded dotterel.

References

External links

Selwyn District Council page for the Rakaia River
Te Ara website page for the Rakaia River
Salmon fishing on the Rakaia River

Rivers of Canterbury, New Zealand
Braided rivers in New Zealand
Important Bird Areas of New Zealand
Rivers of New Zealand